<onlyinclude>Got to Believe is a 2013 Philippine romantic comedy-drama television series directed by Cathy Garcia-Molina and starring Kathryn Bernardo and Daniel Padilla. The series was aired on ABS-CBN and worldwide on The Filipino Channel from August 26, 2013, to March 7, 2014, replacing Huwag Ka Lang Mawawala. and was replaced by Ikaw Lamang. The series finale, dubbed as the Best Ending Ever, was ranked #1 by Kantar Media nationwide TV rating.

Synopsis

Season 1

As young Chichay (Kathryn Bernardo) unexpectedly met young Joaquin (Daniel Padilla) in their family-owned amusement fair, she taught him to believe that magic exists. However, their friendship abruptly ended as Chichay's family moved to the province while Joaquin had an almost-fatal accident which prevented him from living a normal life. Ten years later, they have literally bumped into each other but never had any idea about their childhood past.

Despite living a comfortable and wealthy life, teenage Joaquin feels he is different due to his brain injury. His overprotective mother, Juliana (Carmina Villaroel), unknowingly hired teenage Chichay as his nanny. The two that had started off having an unpleasant relationship with each other eventually became friends. As they found comfort in each other's company, they learned various lessons in life such as the true meaning of friendship, of standing by your family, and of accepting one's self. While their feelings blossomed into love, things also got complicated and had put them to the test as they encountered numerous conflicts like their parents' past, their economic gap and the cause of Joaquin's accident when he was still a kid.

Season 2

The second season began with the episode aptly entitled "The New Chapter", which takes place two years after the events of the first season with both lead characters already living a different life respectively. New challenges and additional conflicts occur for most of the characters while the major plot from the previous season unravels to the storyline. Extensively used to promote the show was the tagline -- "The heart remembers what the mind forgets."

Alex (Liza Soberano) was a major addition to the cast in a pivotal role. It also marks that the series was filmed and used Singapore on some of its episodes having Chichay and Joaquin on several tourist spots in the country.

Cast and characters

Main cast
Kathryn Bernardo as Christina Carlota "Chichay" Tampipi
Daniel Padilla as Joaquin "Wacky Boy / Ryan" S. Manansala

Supporting cast 
Manilyn Reynes as Elizabeth "Betchay / Teddy Bear / Mama Bear" Tampipi
Ian Veneracion as Jaime "Bunny Bear" Manansala
Benjie Paras as Chito "Papa Bear" Tampipi
Carmina Villaroel as Juliana San Juan-Manansala
Joonee Gamboa as Francisco "Lolo Isko" Tampipi 
Chinggoy Alonzo as Ronaldo San Juan
Minnie Aguilar as Matilda Cristobal-Pantoja
Lou Veloso as Mang During Pantoja
Al Tantay as Tatay Poro
Iya Villania as Florence Marie Tampipi
 Thara Jordana as Emma 
Janice Jurado as Rona Manansala
Nina Ricci Alagao as Gigi Galvez
Beverly Salviejo as Tarantina
Cecil Paz as Madam Fifi
Hyubs Azarcon as Whitey
Ethyl Osorio as Ethel
Benjamin Domingo as Bubbles
Darwin "Hap Rice" Tolentino as Nanoy
Mhyco Aquino as Jericho "Jec-Jec" Manansala 
Irma Adlawan as Yaya Puring
Ping Medina as Asiong

Recurring cast
Isabel Granada† as Tessa Velasquez-Zaragosa
Jojo A. as George Zaragosa
Alexander Diaz as Kristoffer "Kit" Rosales
 as Pique Nazareno
Luke Conde as Michael "Mik" Sajone
Kristel Fulgar as Editha "Didith" Pantoja
Trina "Hopia" Legaspi as Lindsay Bernal
Angeli Gonzales as Miley Rodriguez Handcuff
Jon Lucas as Dominic Zaragosa
Yves Flores as Pedro
Miguel Morales as Miguel
Joy Viado† as Prof. Henrietta Ilagan Velasco
Niña Dolino as Professor Aira Jean
Chienna Filomeno as Amanda Lopez
Rolando Inocencio as Dean Chuppongco
Jess Mendoza as Anthony "Tinyong"
Ingrid dela Paz as Patricia Reyes
Liza Soberano as Alexa "Alex" Rodriguez
Zild Benitez as Joaquin's Schoolmate

Guest cast
Kyle Banzon as young Joaquin
Bianca Bentulan as young Chichay
Bobby Andrews as Rodrigo San Juan
Ya Chang as Nanny Agency Manager
Lilia Cuntapay† as Yaya Liling
Emmanuelle Vera as Marga
Ryan Boyce as Jerver
Manuel Chua as Mr. Funye
Ronnie Magsanoc as Coach Frank
Jeron Teng as Allen Chua
Atoy Co as Coach Atoy
Tetchie Agbayani as Madam Lucille
Paolo Serrano as Armand Pantay
Marissa Sanchez as Dean Leonora Pura
Christopher De Leon as Dominic's uncle
Minco Fabregas as Attorney Sarabia
A.G. Saño as A.G.
Kitkat as Betty
Lloyd Samartino as Alex's father
Lassy Marquez as himself
Negi as himself

Production

Premiere
Initially, Got to Believe was originally planned to be premiered back-to-back with Muling Buksan ang Puso on July 8, 2013, replacing Apoy sa Dagat and Missing You. But due to the request of Koreanovela fans, the series was later postponed because of That Winter, the Wind Blows. After the delayed airing, the series aired on August 26, 2013, replacing Huwag Ka Lang Mawawala.

Casting
This Kapamilya series is a reunion project of 80's generation actresses Manilyn Reynes, Isabel Granada and Carmina Villaroel alongside teen idols Benjie Paras, Jojo A. and Ian Veneracion.

Music
The theme song, "Got to Believe in Magic", written by Charles Fox & Stephen Geyer, was originally sung by American singer David Pomeranz as a soundtrack for the 1982 film Zapped!. It was later included in his compilation album, Born for You: His Best and More that was released on July 19, 1999. The album was recorded in the Philippines and co-produced by Pomeranz with Filipino composer Lorrie Ilustre. The song was a popular hit within the country during the time of the album's release. It was also covered by Filipino band Side A and was used as a theme song for the 2002 Filipino romance film Got 2 Believe.

Another song which was a success, especially in the Philippines, was "Ikaw Na Na Na" sung by G2B Boys.

Due to the song's previous usage in the film, director Cathy Garcia-Molina clarified that the television drama is completely different. The rendition featured within the show is sung by Filipina singer Juris.

Reception

Ratings

Fanbase and merchandise
Due to the series' high popularity, it gained a fan base called G2B Army. The series also started releasing different Got to Believe merchandises like covers for tablets, hoodies, and shirts thru B.U.M. Equipment.

Reruns
Reruns of the show's episodes air on Jeepney TV.

On March 18, 2020, ABS-CBN announced that Got to Believe will have a rerun starting March 23, 2020, via the network's Kapamilya Gold afternoon block, replacing Sandugo which has recently wrapped up, as part of ABS-CBN's temporary programming changes due to the COVID-19 pandemic. This rerun was abruptly cut due to the temporary closure of ABS-CBN following the cease and desist order issued by the National Telecommunications Commission on account of its franchise expiration.

All episodes highlights of Got To Believe is currently uploaded on  ABS-CBN Entertainment YouTube Channel, along with Walang Hanggan, 100 Days to Heaven and May Bukas Pa.

See also
List of programs broadcast by ABS-CBN
List of ABS-CBN drama series
List of programs broadcast by Jeepney TV

References

External links
 

ABS-CBN drama series
Philippine romantic comedy television series
2013 Philippine television series debuts
2014 Philippine television series endings
Television shows set in the Philippines
Television shows filmed in Singapore
Television series by Star Creatives
Filipino-language television shows